Kogl, Kögl or KOGL could refer to:

 KOGL (FM), a radio station (89.3 FM) in Gleneden Beach, Oregon, United States
 Korea Open Government License

People with the surname
 Benedikt Kögl (1892–1973), a German artist
 Denise Kögl (born 1988), Austrian former competitive figure skater
 Herbert Kögl (born 1966), Austrian luger 
 Ludwig Kögl (born 1966), German former footballer 

Surnames of Austrian origin
German-language surnames